Myrciaria cambuca, named after its common name cambucá, is a species of plant in the family Myrtaceae. First described in 2019, it is a small shrub with reddish fruit, and was previously misidentified as Myrciaria ferruginea.

Description 
Myrciaria cambuca is a small shrub that reaches up to 3m tall. Its leaves are opposite, between 1.1 and 3.5cm long and between 0.6 and 1.5cm wide. The plant produces reddish fruit up to 15mm in diameter, with up to two seeds.

Distribution 
Myrciaria cambuca is endemic to the subcanopy of the atlantic coastal forest of eastern Brazil, between the states of Paraíba and Espírito Santo.

Conservation status 
It has been proposed that Myrciaria cambuca is endangered, due to farming, urbanisation and the invasion of alien species into its habitat.

References

cambuca
Crops originating from the Americas
Crops originating from Brazil
Tropical fruit
Flora of South America
Endemic flora of Brazil
Fruits originating in South America
Cauliflory
Fruit trees
Berries
Plants described in 2019